Newport News, Virginia is a city in Hampton Roads, Virginia

Newport News may also refer to:
Newport News Shipbuilding, a major shipyard in the United States
USS Newport News, the name of several United States Navy vessels
Newport News, newspaper printed from 1839 by abolitionist William Shreve Bailey